American Horror Story is a horror television series created and produced by Ryan Murphy and Brad Falchuk. The series is broadcast on the cable television channel FX in the United States. Described as an anthology series, each season is conceived as a self-contained miniseries, following a disparate set of characters and settings, and a storyline with its own "beginning, middle, and end".

Since its debut, American Horror Story has earned mostly positive reviews from critics, and has been nominated for a variety of different awards, including nineteen Critics' Choice Television Awards (four wins), ninety-four Emmy Awards (sixteen wins), nine Golden Globe Awards (two wins), six People's Choice Awards (one win), eleven Satellite Awards (three wins), and twenty-six Saturn Awards.

Actress Jessica Lange, who was featured in the first four seasons, has won the most awards of the franchise, including the Primetime Emmy Award, the Golden Globe Award, and the Screen Actors Guild Award for her performance, while the former along with James Cromwell, who starred as Dr. Arthur Arden in the second season, subtitled Asylum, and Kathy Bates, who features since the third season, subtitled Coven, are the only performers to win an Emmy. "Welcome to Briarcliff", the first episode of Asylum, is the most nominated single episode of the series, receiving nominations for seven different awards, winning one Emmy and two Golden Reel Awards.

Total awards and nominations for the cast

Awards and nominations

Notes

References

External links 
 

Awards
American Horror Story